Lance East (22 May 1901 – 23 June 1993) was a British modern pentathlete. He competed at the 1928 Summer Olympics.

References

1901 births
1993 deaths
British male modern pentathletes
Olympic modern pentathletes of Great Britain
Modern pentathletes at the 1928 Summer Olympics
[[Category:Athletes from Chennai]